A steel worker is any person who works in the process of making steel.

Steel worker may also refer to:

 A member of the United Steelworkers
 Steelworker (United States Navy), United States Navy occupational rating, working with steel

See also

 Steeler (disambiguation)
 Steelers (disambiguation)
 Steelman (disambiguation)
 Worker (disambiguation)
 Steel (disambiguation)